Pir Zaman (also Romanized as Pīr Zamān; also known as Parzaman) is a village in Sanjabad-e Shomali Rural District, in the Central District of Kowsar County, Ardabil Province, Iran. At the 2006 census, its population was 48, in 12 families.

References

External Links 
Tageo

Towns and villages in Kowsar County